Prof. Ghanta Chakrapani (born 1965) is a distinguished Academician and the first (founder) Chairman(2014-2020) of Telangana State Public Service Commission. At Present he is working as a professor of Sociology and Dean of Social Sciences at Dr. B. R. Ambedkar Open University, Hyderabad. Associated with peoples movements, democratic and rights movements he became a public intellectual in the region. Since 1997, Bhuvanagiri meeting he was directly associated with the Telangana separate statehood movement, and emerged as one of the protagonists of the Telangana agitation, as a writer, public speaker, columnist, and Television analyst he played multiple roles in the spread of Telangana ideology. He is one of the founders of the Peace Initiative Committee which negotiated with the government and Maoist Naxalites for peace talks in 2004-05. During the talks, the Government of Andhra Pradesh (AP) appointed him as the convenor for the Cease-fire Monitoring Committee. After the formation of a separate State for Telangana, the Government of Telangana appointed Dr.Chakrapani as the first Chairman of TSPSC. After assuming the Charge as Chairman, TSPSC in December 2014, Prof. Chakrapani has introduced several path-breaking reforms and introduced IT initiatives to modernize the conduct of examinations and processing of recruitments.The Hans India, thereby transforming the youngest State PSC in the country into a modern Public Service Commission.The Hindu.

Early life
Born in Karimnagar District, Telangana, Dr. Chakrapani completed his Post Graduation (MA)Gold Medalist in Sociology, Post Graduation in Mass Communication and Journalism (MCJ) and Ph.D on Religion from Osmania University, Hyderabad.

Career
Ghanta Chakrapani started his career as a journalist in 1985. He was a reporter/Sub-Editor in Udayam, Andhra Jyothi, which are the popular Telugu language newspapers published from Hyderabad. Later he worked as Public Relations Officer at Andhra Pradesh Open University for a very brief period and panel newsreader in All India Radio (AIR), Hyderabad.

Academic
Dr. Chakrapani shifted to academics in the early 1990s. He worked as a lecturer in the Department of Sociology at [Kakatiya University], Warangal. Later he joined as Assistant Professor at Dr. B. R. Ambedkar Open University, Hyderabad. He served in the University in various capacities including the Head-Department of Sociology, Dean, Faculty of Social Sciences, Director, Center for Staff Training and Development (CSTD) and Director, Centre for Social Empowerment. He also served as the Registrar of the University from 2004–06 and developed and coordinated new academic programmes and courses in different fields like Sociology, Political Science, Human Rights, Women Studies, Mass Media, and other Social Sciences.  

His fellowships and academic distinctions include Fellow, India China Institute, New York, Senior Fellow, JAPSS, USA, European Commission, Austria, Member, Sahitya Academy etc. He has several scholarly publications to his credit. He published 13 books and hundreds of articles in Telugu and English. During Telangana Movement, he wrote "Ghantapatham. https://ghantapatham.blogspot.com/, a popular weekly column in Namasthe Telangana Telugu daily continuously for three years and participated in TV debates to educate the masses. Dr. Chakrapani is a strong proponent of Telangana movement and had actively participated in major agitations for a separate Telangana State as a public speaker. He hosted a popular television show, The Insider. He is having his own YouTube Channel Ghantapatham.

Bibliography
 Pambalas:Aneka publications, Hyderabad, 2009,  
 Empowered Voices, Success Stories of Distance Education, CSE Publications, Hyderabad, 2009, 
 Memu Saitham CSE Publications, Hyderabad, 2009, 
 Globalisation and Social Exclusion in India, Milind Publications, New Delhi, 2009
 Education, Exclusion and Empowerment, Milind Publications, New Delhi, 2008
 Samajika Sandarbham, Aneka Publications, Hyderabad, 2006
 Samajashastra Nighantuvu, Dictionary of Sociology- Co-authored,  Telugu Academy, Government of AP, Hyderabad, 2000
 Samajashastra Moola sutraalu, -Principles of Sociology, Co-authored, Telugu Academy, Government of AP, Hyderabad, 1996
 Samajika Manavashastram-Prathamika Sutraalu, Principles of Social Anthropology, Telugu Academy, Government of AP,
 Boggu Porallo Aggi Bavuta, Coal mining in the context of Economic Reforms:   Umesh paperbacks, Hyderabad-2010
 Globalisation and Social Transition in India and China- Authors Press, New Delhi-2013,

References

External links
 https://www.youtube.com/user/ghantapatham 
 https://ghantapatham.blogspot.com/
 http://www.indiachinainstitute.org/fellows/chakrapani_ghanta/%5B%5D
 https://web.archive.org/web/20111116023636/http://www.iuhs-edu.net/faculty_and_staff
 https://web.archive.org/web/20081227230409/http://www.newschool.edu/ici/subpage.aspx?id=10042
 http://youtube.ng/watch?v=Ajc0BRGiqBA
 About Ghanta Chakrapani
 https://web.archive.org/web/20120516044441/http://www.braou.ac.in/braouuserfiles/file/pdfs/GhantaChakrapani.pdf

Academic staff of Dr. B.R. Ambedkar Open University
Living people
People from Karimnagar
1965 births